is a retired Japanese long-distance runner. He competed in the marathon at the 1964, 1968 and 1972 Olympics and finished in eighth, second and fifth place, respectively. He won two gold medals in the marathon at the Asian Games in 1966 and 1970, and won the Boston Marathon in 1966.

He was very successful on the Japanese road racing circuit, winning the Tokyo International Marathon and Lake Biwa Marathon in both 1963 and 1964, and registering four wins at the Beppu-Ōita Marathon between 1967 and 1973.

Kimihara raced in the 2016 Boston Marathon, celebrating the 50th anniversary of his 1966 win.  He completed the race in a time of 4:53:14.

Achievements
All results regarding marathon, unless stated otherwise

References

1941 births
Living people
Sportspeople from Kitakyushu
Japanese male long-distance runners
Japanese male marathon runners
Olympic male marathon runners
Olympic athletes of Japan
Olympic silver medalists for Japan
Olympic silver medalists in athletics (track and field)
Athletes (track and field) at the 1964 Summer Olympics
Athletes (track and field) at the 1968 Summer Olympics
Athletes (track and field) at the 1972 Summer Olympics
Medalists at the 1968 Summer Olympics
Asian Games gold medalists for Japan
Asian Games gold medalists in athletics (track and field)
Athletes (track and field) at the 1966 Asian Games
Athletes (track and field) at the 1970 Asian Games
Medalists at the 1966 Asian Games
Medalists at the 1970 Asian Games
Boston Marathon male winners
Japan Championships in Athletics winners
20th-century Japanese people
21st-century Japanese people